Robin Ngalande Junior (born 2 November 1992) is a Malawian footballer who plays as a striker for Ethiopian club Saint George.

Club career
Born in Dedza, Ngalande began his career with Civo United. He later joined the youth team of Spanish club Atlético Madrid in September 2010, joining from the youth ranks of South African club Mamelodi Sundowns. Ngalande had been offered contracts by sixteen other European clubs.

Ngalande returned to South Africa in 2012 signing a two-year contract with Bidvest Wits.

On 10 July 2014, Ngalande signed a season-long loan deal with Ajax Cape Town. In July 2015 he moved on loan again, this time to Platinum Stars. In December 2015 his performances for the club were criticised. After returning from his loan at the end of the season, he was said to be considering his options.

Ngalande was released by Bidvest in September 2016. After a spell with Masters Security, he signed for Baroka in July 2017, but terminated his contract with them in May 2018.

In January 2019 Ngalande signed for Azerbaijani club Zira.

On 10 June 2019, Ngalande signed a new two-year contract with Zira. On 27 January 2020, Ngalande was released by Zira.

He signed for Ethiopian club Saint George for the 2020–21 season.

International career
He made his senior international debut for Malawi in 2012.
At the youth level he played in the 2009 African U-17 Championship, scoring a brace in their 5–0 win over Zimbabwe national under-17 football team.

References

1992 births
Living people
Malawian footballers
Malawi international footballers
Malawi youth international footballers
Civo United FC players
Mamelodi Sundowns F.C. players
Atlético Madrid C players
Bidvest Wits F.C. players
Cape Town Spurs F.C. players
Platinum Stars F.C. players
Masters Security FC players
Baroka F.C. players
Zira FK players
Saint George S.C. players
Association football forwards
Malawian expatriate footballers
Malawian expatriate sportspeople in South Africa
Expatriate soccer players in South Africa
Malawian expatriate sportspeople in Spain
Expatriate footballers in Spain
Malawian expatriate sportspeople in Azerbaijan
Expatriate footballers in Azerbaijan
Malawian expatriate sportspeople in Ethiopia
Expatriate footballers in Ethiopia
2021 Africa Cup of Nations players